The Family Courts Act 1980 is a  New Zealand law covering family courts, which have jurisdiction over marriage, civil unions, divorce, custody of children, child support and wills. Family courts are a division of the District Court and also operate under the District Courts Act 1947. Family courts were among the first in New Zealand to focus on informality; neither judges nor lawyers may wear wigs and gowns are banned for lawyers and optional for judges.

The Act is notable for Section 11B, which amounts to a default blanket ban on reporting of most of the business of the court when children are involved. Stories that are reported often have details such as the gender of children omitted. A rare instance of detailed on-going coverage was the kidnapping of Jayden Headley, when publishing of the details was encouraged to locate the victim.

Most of the acts the family courts have jurisdiction over have been updated to include same-sex partners. Exceptions are the Marriage Act 1955, which is matched by the Civil Union Act 2004 and the Adoption Act 1955 which currently prevents same-sex couples from adopting. There is currently political pressure to change this.

References

External links 
 Official text of the Act

Statutes of New Zealand
1980 in New Zealand law
New Zealand family law